The Chevauchée of Lancaster may refer to:
Gascon campaign of 1345, conducted by Henry of Grosmont, Earl of Derby, in south west France
Chevauchée of 1346, conducted by Henry of Grosmont, 1st Duke of Lancaster in south west France.
Chevauchée of 1356, conducted by Henry of Grosmont, 1st Duke of Lancaster in northern France
Chevauchée of 1369, conducted by John of Gaunt, through northern France 
Chevauchée of 1373, conducted by John of Gaunt, through France